Macrophage elastase (metalloelastase, human macrophage metalloelastase (HME), MMP-12) is an enzyme. This enzyme catalyses the following chemical reaction

 Hydrolysis of soluble and insoluble elastin. Specific cleavages are also produced at -Ala14-Leu- and -Tyr16-Leu- in the B chain of insulin

This enzyme belongs to the peptidase family M10.

See also 
 Matrix metallopeptidase 12

References

External links 
 

EC 3.4.24